Dietrich von Rothenstein (died 31 January 1580) was the Prince-Bishop of Worms from 1552 to 1580.  He was appointed bishop on November 28, 1552, and died in office on January 31, 1580.

References

1580 deaths
Roman Catholic bishops of Worms
Year of birth unknown